La Talaudière is a commune in the Loire department in central France.

Population

Twin towns
La Talaudière is twinned with:

  Sio, Mali
  Küssaberg, Germany

See also
Communes of the Loire department

References

Communes of Loire (department)
Loire communes articles needing translation from French Wikipedia